The 2007 Scottish League Cup final was played on 18 March 2007 at Hampden Park in Glasgow and was the 60th Scottish League Cup final. The final was contested by Kilmarnock and Hibernian, who had never met before in a cup final. Hibernian won the match 5–1.

Road to the final

The previous year's winners were Celtic, who had beaten Dunfermline Athletic 3–0 in the 2006 final, but they were knocked out in the quarter-finals by Falkirk, who beat them 5–4 on penalties. With Dunfermline also being eliminated in the early rounds, it was the fourth successive year in which both of the previous year's finalists did not make it back to the final.

Rangers' shock 2–0 defeat by First Division club St Johnstone meant that neither Old Firm club featured in the semi-finals. Kilmarnock beat Falkirk 3–0 at Fir Park and Hibernian beat St Johnstone 3–1 after extra time at Tynecastle in the semi-finals.

Match details

References

2007
Kilmarnock F.C. matches
Hibernian F.C. matches
League Cup Final
2000s in Glasgow